Baft County is in Kerman province, Iran. The capital of the county is the city of Baft. At the 2006 census, the county's population was 138,847, in 32,262 households. The following census in 2011 counted 75,940 people in 21,195 households, by which time Arzuiyeh District and Dehsard Rural District had been separated from the county to form Arzuiyeh County, and Rabor District separated to become Rabor County. At the 2016 census, the county's population was 84,103 in 26,543 households.

The elevation of Baft County is 2,280 to 2,315m. Baft is one of highest counties in Iran and some areas have elevations reaching 2,800m. There are high mountains in Baft, some over 4,300m.

Administrative divisions

The population history and structural changes of Baft County's administrative divisions over three consecutive censuses are shown in the following table. The latest census shows two districts, six rural districts, and two cities.

References

 

Counties of Kerman Province